So Smooth is Perry Como's first RCA Victor 12" long-play album, recorded and originally released in 1955. This was also Perry's first album recorded at Webster Hall in New York City, and his first album with the Ray Charles Singers who would support him generally throughout the remainder of his recording career. So Smooth was released in the UK as We Get Letters Volume 2 as Perry's popularity gained international appeal during the late 1950s; under this title, the album peaked at number 4 in the Record Mirror album chart, entering on 28 June 1958 and spending seven weeks within the Top 5.

Although RCA Victor issued several LP collections by Como prior to this album, this was Como's first album of all-new material recorded especially for an LP release.   
Como viewed the LP format differently from the singles market, eschewing the kind of popular novelty songs he often recorded for single releases on the 45 and 78 RPM format in favor of collections devoted to well-known standards mostly dating back to the 1930s and '40s.

All selections are arranged by Joe Lipman.

Track listing
Side one
"It's a Good Day" (Words and music by Peggy Lee and Dave Barbour) – 1:43
"As Time Goes By" (Words and music by Herman Hupfeld) – 3:12
"I've Got the World on a String" (Words and music by Harold Arlen and Ted Koehler) – 2:21
"My Funny Valentine" (Words and music by Richard Rodgers and Lorenz Hart) – 2:44
"For Me and My Gal" (Words and music by George W. Meyer, Edgar Leslie and E. Ray Goetz) – 2:33
"I Gotta Right to Sing the Blues" (Words and music by Harold Arlen and Ted Koehler) – 2:47

Side two
"Breezin' Along with the Breeze" (Words and music by Haven Gillespie, Seymour Simons and Richard Whiting) – 2:17
"It's the Talk of the Town" (Words and music by Jerry Livingston and Marty Symes with Al J. Neiburg) – 3:40
"You Do Something to Me" (Words and music by Cole Porter) – 1:54
"It Happened in Monterey" (Words and music by Mabel Wayne and William Rose) – 3:03
"One for My Baby and One More for the Road"  (Words and music by Harold Arlen and Johnny Mercer) – 3:43
"In The Still of the Night" (Words and music by Cole Porter) – 2:45

References

External links
Perry Como Discography

Perry Como albums
1955 albums
RCA Victor albums